Hasan Bozer (born 1944) is a politician. He served as the speaker of the Assembly of the Republic of Northern Cyprus from 6 May 2009 to 28 August 2013. 

Bozer is married and has one child.

References 

1944 births
Living people
People from Paphos District
National Unity Party (Northern Cyprus) politicians
Speakers of the Assembly of Northern Cyprus
Members of the Assembly of the Republic (Northern Cyprus)
Hacettepe University alumni
Istanbul University Cerrahpaşa Faculty of Medicine alumni
Turkish Cypriot expatriates in Turkey